Boophis pauliani is a species of frogs in the family Mantellidae.

It is endemic to Madagascar.

Its natural habitats are subtropical or tropical moist lowland forests, subtropical or tropical moist montane forests, rivers, swamps, intermittent freshwater marshes, arable land, pastureland, and heavily degraded former forest.

It is threatened by habitat loss.

References

pauliani
Endemic frogs of Madagascar
Taxa named by Jean Marius René Guibé
Amphibians described in 1953
Taxonomy articles created by Polbot